Rote Hellström (1 April 1908 – 13 November 1995) was a Finnish sailor. He competed in the 6 Metre event at the 1948 Summer Olympics.

References

External links
 

1908 births
1995 deaths
Finnish male sailors (sport)
Olympic sailors of Finland
Sailors at the 1948 Summer Olympics – 6 Metre
People from Uusikaupunki
Sportspeople from Southwest Finland